Nadiya Borovska (born 25 February 1981, in Zghorany village) is a Ukrainian race walker. She competed in the 20 kilometres event at the 2012 Summer Olympics finishing in 16th place. In 2018, she competed in the women's 20 kilometres walk event at the European Athletics Championships held in Berlin, Germany. She finished in 10th place.

In 2019, she competed in the women's 20 kilometres walk event at the World Athletics Championships held in Doha, Qatar. She finished in 20th place.

References

Ukrainian female racewalkers
1981 births
Living people
Olympic athletes of Ukraine
Athletes (track and field) at the 2012 Summer Olympics
Athletes (track and field) at the 2016 Summer Olympics
World Athletics Championships athletes for Ukraine
Sportspeople from Volyn Oblast
20th-century Ukrainian women
21st-century Ukrainian women